Percina aurora, the pearl darter is a small species of freshwater ray-finned fish, a darter from the subfamily Etheostomatinae, part of the family Percidae, which also contains the perches, ruffes and pikeperches. It is native to the United States, where it is known only from Louisiana and Mississippi, but seems no longer to be present in the Pearl River. Its total area of occupation is under , it is a rare species and a candidate for federal protection. It is threatened by siltation, pollution, habitat destruction and urbanization, and as a result, the International Union for Conservation of Nature has classified its conservation status as being "endangered".

Description
This fish was described as a species in 1994. It had previously been included in Percina copelandi.

The pearl darter grows up to 57 (female) to 64 (male) millimeters long. It has a black spot at the base of the tail fin. The breeding male has a few dark bands. It is usually mature around one year of age.

Distribution and habitat
This fish is now limited to the Pascagoula River drainage in Louisiana and Mississippi states in the United States. It has apparently been extirpated from the Pearl River. The total range is about 200 square kilometers.

This fish can be found in riffles and shallow, fast-moving river water. Higher river flows in the spring help to disperse the juveniles. Its favored habitat is unknown but its habitat requirements are likely similar to those of P. copelandi. This related species feeds on midges and small crustaceans.

Threats to this species include pollution via runoff of fertilizers, pesticides, oil, and other materials. Sediment and silt degrade the habitat. Hurricane Katrina impacted the local area, washing pollutants and salt water into the river. The release of dioxin into the Pascagoula system has been mitigated, but dioxin embedded in the substrate may be stirred up at times, entering the water. Riverside urbanization may lead to organic wastes being released into the water. Sand and gravel mining occur in the river system and destabilize the substrate. Habitat destruction has led to the species' populations being split and isolated, creating a disjunct distribution. This split makes it more likely that populations will become extirpated.

References

External links
Percina aurora photo. National Geographic.

aurora
Taxa named by Royal Dallas Suttkus
Taxa named by Bruce A. Thompson
Fish described in 1994
ESA threatened species